SM4 or Sm4 may refer to:

 VR Class Sm4, a type of train operated by the VR Group
 SM4, a part of the SM postcode area, in Sutton, England
 HST-SM4, the final servicing mission to the Hubble Space Telescope
 SM4 (cipher), a block cipher used in the Chinese National Standard
 Standard Missile 4, a missile